The S2 service of the S-Bahn Rhein-Main system bearing the KBS (German scheduled railway route) number 645.2 is a railway connection between the small Taunus town Niedernhausen and Dietzenbach.

Usually DBAG Class 423 railcars are used on this service. Its predecessor class 420 is only used for shortened shuttle services.

According to a news report issued by Hessenschau, the S2 is the least punctual of the system, with only 83% of trains leaving on time.

Routes

Main-Lahn railway 

The service uses the tracks of the Main-Lahn Railway between Niedernhausen and Frankfurt Central Station. This route is also used by regional trains in the section Niedernhausen–Frankfurt-Höchst. Between Frankfurt-Höchst and Central Station this service shares the Main-Lahn line with freight and shunting operations. National and regional services use the parallel running Taunus railway in this section. The Main-Lahn railway was completed on 15 October 1877 and has been used by S-Bahn services since 1978.

City tunnel 

The city tunnel is an underground, pure S-Bahn route used by almost all services (except for the S7 service which terminates at the central station). The tunnel was opened in four stages in 1978, 1983, 1990 and 1992. In a short section between Mühlberg and Offenbach-Kaiserlei the South Main railway is used. The section from Mühlberg to Offenbach Ost through the Offenbach City Tunnel was opened in 1995.

Rodgau railway 

This line was opened in 1896 and has been used since 2003 only by S-Bahn services.

Offenbach-Bieber–Dietzenbach railway

This line was opened on 1 December 1898 and has been used since 2003 only by S-Bahn services.

History 

The S2 was one of the first six services of the Rhine-Main S-Bahn system. In a prior test operation it ran between Niedernhausen and Frankfurt Central Station. The service was then called R2 where the letter "R" stands for regional. In 1975 the R2 was the system's first service employing the class 420 trainset. After the opening of the Frankfurt Citytunnel the service was renamed to S2 and extended to the new Hauptwache underground station. Further extensions of the tunnel followed in 1983 (Konstablerwache) and 1990 (Ostendstraße and Lokalbahnhof) so that the Südbahnhof (South station) became the service's eastern terminal. After the opening of the eastern Citytunnel branch to the Mühlberg station in 1992 the S2 started operation in this section shutting down its service to Lokalbahnhof and Südbahnhof until in 1995 the service resumed its pre-1992 operation. In 2002, Eppstein-Bremthal station was completed increasing the number of stations to 18.

In 2003 the Offenbach Citytunnel and the Rodgau railway was included. After two years of construction work this route was changed to S-Bahn operation. Since then the new eastern terminal station is Dietzenbach. In 2007 the new Frankfurt-Zeilsheim station was included to the S2 service.

Operation 
 Niedernhausen – Dietzenbach
 Niedernhausen – Offenbach Ost
 Niedernhausen – Frankfurt Hbf
 Hofheim – Frankfurt Hbf
 Griesheim – Dietzenbach
 Offenbach Ost – Dietzenbach

References

External links 

 traffiQ Frankfurt – S2 timetable

Rhine-Main S-Bahn